The Trondheimsleia is a strait in Møre og Romsdal and Trøndelag counties in Norway. The strait has several fjords which branch off it including the Ramsøyfjorden, Hemnfjorden, and Trondheimsfjorden. The islands of Leksa are located in the Trondheimsleia in Orkland. The Hitra Tunnel is a road tunnel underneath the Trondheimsleia connecting the island of Hitra to the mainland.

References

Smøla
Hitra
Aure, Norway
Heim, Norway
Orkland
Fjords of Møre og Romsdal
Fjords of Trøndelag